Michael Camille (1958–2002), Mary L. Block Professor at the University of Chicago, was an influential, provocative scholar and historian of medieval art and specialist of the European Middle Ages.

In The New York Times obituary of Michael Camille, The New York Times writes,  "Mr. Camille was noted for bringing contemporary critical theory and social perspectives to the study of medieval art. Using anthropological, psychoanalytic, semiotic and other approaches, as well as traditional art historical methods, he described the Middle Ages as a time of complex social and political ferment with similarities to modern experience." Camille's new approach marked "a departure from the more popular conception of the period as a remote and static 'age of faith.'''

The New York Times obituary of Michael Camille is titled "Michael Camille, an influential and provocative scholar of medieval art at the University of Chicago, died on April 29. He was 44."

"Camille's first article in the English journal Art History (1985) brought him immediate attention."  Camille applied himself to "the traditional field of medieval manuscript illumination," but with new perspectives.

His work is translated into "Spanish, French, Japanese, and Korean," and his book Image on the Edge "was reviewed by publications ranging from the Burlington Magazine to the Wall Street Journal."

Life
Michael Camille was born in Keighley, Yorkshire, on 6 March 1958. He studied English and Art History at Peterhouse, Cambridge, graduating with a first class honours degree in 1980 and with a PhD in 1985.

Immediately after obtaining his doctorate he began work at the University of Chicago, where he remained for the rest of his short career. He was best known for applying post-structuralist ideas to questions of medieval art history. In 1996 he visited Medieval Times with Ira Glass for a segment of This American Life. In 2001 he was awarded a Guggenheim Fellowship.

He died of a brain tumor on 29 April 2002.

Works
The Gothic Idol: Ideology and Image-Making in Medieval Art  (New York: Cambridge University Press, 1989). 
Image on the Edge (Cambridge, Mass.: Harvard University Press, 1992). 
Master of Death: The Lifeless Art of Pierre Remiet, Illuminator (New Haven: Yale University Press, 1996).  
Gothic Art: Glorious Visions (New York: Abrams, 1996). 
Mirror in Parchment: The Luttrell Psalter and the Making of Medieval England (Chicago: University of Chicago Press, 1998). 
The Medieval Art of Love: Objects and Subjects of Desire (New York: Abrams, 1998). 
"Before the Gaze: The Internal Senses and Late Medieval Practices of Seeing." In Visuality Before and Beyond the Renaissance: Seeing as Others Saw (Cambridge and New York: Cambridge University Press, 2000): 197–223. 
The Gargoyles of Notre-Dame: Medievalism and the Monsters of Modernity (Chicago: University of Chicago Press, 2009).

References

1958 births
2002 deaths
British art historians
British medievalists
Alumni of Peterhouse, Cambridge
University of Chicago faculty